Doreen Kessy is a Tanzanian education activist, and entrepreneur - founder and CEO of Jamani Africa a food processing and distribution company based in Tanzania. She is the former Chief Business Officer and Chief Operations Officer at Ubongo Learning Ltd, a social enterprise that provides educational content using cartoons. Kessy joined Ubongo in 2014 to work towards a solution for the lack of fun educational content in Africa produced in local African languages. They believed that by employing Ubongo, instructors' work with children could be supported and made much easier when the topic was taught through cartoons.
It is estimated that almost 25 million family households in 41 countries in Africa watch and learn from Ubongo cartoons every week.

Education and career
Kessy received a master's degree in Business Administration and a bachelor's degree in International Business and Economics from Liberty University in Virginia. Prior to Ubongo, Kessy worked with a variety of organizations including International Justice Mission, Wells Fargo and Smile Africa, and she designed poverty relief programs implemented in Zimbabwe and Zambia.

Activism
An Educational Activist, Kessy seeks to improve and make difficult subjects in education more simple and easy to understood for African children. Ubongo teaches math and science through funny animated stories and songs. Kessy also provides the English voice of one of the characters in the Ubongo animated material, a monkey named Ngedere.

Awards
On 10 October 2018, Kessy was among eight innovators who were awarded with African Union Education Innovation Prizes. The Innovating in Education Africa Expo 2018 took place in Dakar, Senegal.

See also
 Irene Tarimo
 Mary Mgonja
 Joyce Msuya
 Frannie Leautier
 Elizabeth Mrema
 Fausta Shakiwa Mosha

References

External links
 https://www.ubongo.org/

Tanzanian businesspeople
Tanzanian women
Living people
Year of birth missing (living people)
People from Kilimanjaro Region